Grand Prix motorcycle racing is the premier championship of motorcycle road racing, which is divided into three classes: Moto3, Moto2 and MotoGP. Former classes that have been discontinued include 350cc, 250cc, 125cc, 50cc/80cc and Sidecar. Moto3 replaced the 125cc class in 2012. Moto3 runs 250cc single-cylinder engines as opposed to the 125cc engines used previously. The engines have single cylinders, as opposed to the four cylinders used in MotoGP. Moto3 is the class where young riders first participate in Grand Prix motorcycle racing. The minimum age for a rider is 16 years and the maximum is 28 years. The Grand Prix Road-Racing World Championship was established in 1949 by the sport's governing body, the Fédération Internationale de Motocyclisme (FIM), and is the oldest motorsport World Championship.

Each season consists of 12 to 18 Grands Prix contested on closed circuits, as opposed to public roads. Points earned in these events count toward the drivers' and constructors' world championships. The driver's and constructor's championship are separate championships, but are based on the same point system. The number of points awarded at the end of each race to the top 15 qualifying riders depends on their placement. Points received by each finisher, from first 1st place to 15th place: 25, 20, 16, 13, 11, 10, 9, 8, 7, 6, 5, 4, 3, 2, 1. Historically, there have been several points systems. Results from all current Grands Prix count towards the championships; in the past, only a certain number of results were counted.

Ángel Nieto has won the most championships, with seven. Loris Capirossi is the youngest to win the championship; he was 17 years and 165 days old when he won in 1990. Italian riders have won the most championships; 14 riders have won a total of 23 championships. Spaniards have won the second most; 6 riders have won a total of 12 championships. Riders from Great Britain have won the third most, as four riders have won a total of four championships. Nello Pagani won the inaugural championship in 1949. Nicolas Terol was the last rider to win the 125cc championship in 2011. Rupert Hollaus' 1954 title was the only time a posthumous World Champion was crowned in any class in Grand Prix motorcycle racing as he was killed before the 1954 season was over. Emilio Alzamora's 1999 title was the only time in Grand Prix motorcycle racing that a rider won the championship without winning a race in a season. Sandro Cortese was the first rider to win the Moto3 championship in 2012. Izan Guevara is the current champion; he won the 2022 Moto3 World Championship.

Champions

 The "Season" column refers to the season the competition was held, and wikilinks to the article about that season.
 The "Margin" column refers to the margin of points by which the winner defeated the runner-up.

By season

Multiple champions

By constructor

By nationality

References
General
 

Bibliography

 

Specific

125cc World Champions
Moto 125